Gazeta Olsztyńska (English: Olsztyn Daily) is a Polish language newspaper, published in Olsztyn.

The newspaper was first published in the years 1886–1939, in what was then East Prussia. Its first editor in chief was an ethnic Warmiak Jan Liszewski, after him the paper was taken over by the Pieniezny family.

Since January 1, 1921 "Gazeta Olsztyńska" has been published six times a week, together with regular extras, such as the Sunday Guest, Farmer, Life of the Youth, Voice of the Borderland. Especially popular was a column written in the local dialect of the Polish language. The column, titled Kuba from Wartembork Says, was authored by Seweryn Pieniężny.

Gazeta Olsztyńska's publishing house issued other papers, such as Gazeta Polska for the Vistula counties, Evangelical Voice, Teacher's Guide. In the interbellum period, the Pieniezny family printing shop printed some 47 books and brochures.

After World War II, when the city of Olsztyn became part of Poland, Gazeta Olsztyńska returned in 1970. It is now a major daily in the area.

The newspaper gained international attention when a photoshopped version of Pedobear, an internet meme originating from the controversial website 4chan, appeared along with 2010 Winter Olympic and Paralympic Games mascots in an article on the games in Gazeta Olsztyńska.

References

External links
 Gazeta Olsztyńska - Official webpage (in Polish only)
 Edytor Sp. z o. o. - Its publisher's website (in Polish only)
 Dziennik Elbląski - Local offshoot of the newspaper

Publications established in 1886
Daily newspapers published in Germany
Daily newspapers published in Poland
Mass media in Olsztyn
1886 establishments in Germany